The ambassador of the United States of America to the Republic of the Philippines was established on July 4, 1946, after the Philippines gained its independence from the United States.

The ambassador to the Philippines has also been accredited to the Republic of Palau since 1996. The ambassador works at the Embassy of the United States in Manila along Roxas Boulevard and holds residence in Forbes Park in Makati. The ambassador also has a summer residence in Baguio, The American Residence.

Ambassadors extraordinary and plenipotentiary to the Republic of the Philippines

Notes

See also
List of ambassadors of the Philippines to the United States
Embassy of the Philippines, Washington, D.C.
Embassy of the United States, Manila
Philippines–United States relations
Foreign relations of the Philippines
Ambassadors of the United States

References
United States Department of State: Background notes on the Philippines

External links
 United States Department of State: Chiefs of Mission for the Philippines
 United States Department of State: Philippines
 United States Embassy in Manila

 
Philippines
United States